Gorgyra vosseleri is a butterfly in the family Hesperiidae. It is found in Tanzania (from the north-east to the Usambara Mountains). The habitat consists of submontane forests at altitudes between 900 and 1,200 meters.

Adult males are attracted to wet sand.

References

Endemic fauna of Tanzania
Butterflies described in 1907
Erionotini